The Vermont Marble Museum or Vermont Marble Exhibit is a museum commemorating the contributions of Vermont marble and the Vermont Marble Company, located in Proctor, Vermont, United States. The museum is located in a wing of one of the former Vermont Marble Company buildings.

Vermont Marble Company

The Vermont Marble Company was founded in 1880 by businessman and politician Redfield Proctor, who served as the company's first president. Marble was quarried from several locations in the town of Proctor, then called Sutherland Falls, and the surrounding communities of Rutland, West Rutland and Danby. As railroads arrived in Rutland and Proctor, the Vermont Marble company became one of the largest producers of marble in the world. The company provided marble for the construction of such notable icons as the USS Arizona Memorial, the West Virginia State Capitol, the Oregon State Capitol, the United States Supreme Court Building, the Arlington National Cemetery, and Yale University's Beinecke Rare Book and Manuscript Library to name a few. The Tomb of the Unknown Soldier was also created there.  The surrounding town was named after Redfield Proctor and became a company town.

The buildings and quarries of the Vermont Marble Company are now owned by OMYA, a supplier of industrial minerals.

Exhibit

The exhibit offers self-guided tours focusing on the company's history, the geology of marble and other local stones, and the uses of marble in art, architecture, and industry. A short video narrates the history of the Vermont Marble Company, and historical photographs of VMC workers quarrying, carving, and shipping Vermont marble are displayed throughout the exhibit.  Several geologic exhibits, including an artificial cave and a preserved triceratops skeleton are also on display. A display contains large slabs of decorative stone, including the local Danby white and deep green verde antique. This display also includes local granites and imported marbles. Numerous sculptures, including busts of nearly all the U.S. presidents, The Last Supper, and other works are scattered throughout the museum. An artists' studio allows visitors to watch carving demonstrations and ask questions of local sculptors. The architectural uses of marble are displayed in a small chapel and a modern kitchen and bathroom surfaced in stone. Visitors may also get a balcony view of one of the large 19th-century warehouses of the Vermont Marble Company, now used by OMYA.

A nearby quarry (now defunct), located about a quarter mile from the museum itself, has recently been added to the exhibit.  The grounds around the exhibit hold large chunks of quarried, unfinished marble.  The Preservation Trust of Vermont acquired the Vermont Marble Company in 2014.

Also, the town of Proctor has many sidewalks made of marble, and the high school and Catholic church are both faced in local stone. Most of the buildings of the former Vermont Marble Company still stand, and many are constructed of Vermont marble.

References

Website
 Vermont Marble Museum

Museums in Rutland County, Vermont
Mining museums in Vermont
Industry museums in Vermont
Natural history museums in Vermont
Buildings and structures in Proctor, Vermont
Sculpture gardens, trails and parks in the United States
Art museums and galleries in Vermont
Marble
Monumental masonry companies